James Southerland III (born April 28, 1990) is an American professional basketball player for the NBA G League Ignite of the NBA G League. He played college basketball for Syracuse.

High school career
Southerland played for Coach Ron Naclerio at Cardozo High School. He participated in the 2006 Reebok ABCD Camp (N.J.). As a junior, he averaged 17.6 points, 11.3 rebounds and 2.6 assists for Cardozo. Southerland helped the squad to a 22–5 record. For 2008–09, he moved to Notre Dame Prep. He was rated 87th among the Class of 2009 small forwards by Scouts Inc.

College career
Over his four-year career, Southerland averaged 7.9 points and 3.3 rebounds while shooting .449 from the field and .370 from three-point range in 112 games. With nine, he tied the school record for made threes in a single game, at Arkansas, on November 30, 2012, while scoring a career-best 35 points. Was named Big East Player of the Week on December 3, 2012. On January 11, 2013, in his final season at Syracuse, Southerland was declared ineligible due to an undisclosed academic issue. He was reinstated on February 10, after missing six games. On senior night at the Carrier Dome, he recorded his first collegiate double-double, by scoring 22 points and grabbing 10 rebounds, against DePaul.  During the 2013 Big East tournament, Southerland set records for most three-pointers made in a game without a miss (6 vs Pittsburgh) and total number of threes made (20) in a single tournament, while being named to the All-Tournament team. Was selected as a member of the East Regional All-Tournament team during the 2013 NCAA tournament.

College statistics

Source:

Professional career
After going undrafted in the 2013 NBA draft, Southerland joined the Philadelphia 76ers for the Orlando Summer League and the Golden State Warriors for the Las Vegas Summer League.

On September 5, 2013, he signed with the Charlotte Bobcats. On December 11, 2013, he was waived by the Bobcats after playing in just one game. On December 19, 2013, he was acquired by the Los Angeles D-Fenders.

New Orleans Pelicans (2014)
On April 11, 2014, he signed with the New Orleans Pelicans for the rest of the 2013–14 season.

On September 24, 2014, he signed with the Portland Trail Blazers. However, he was later waived by the Trail Blazers on October 13, 2014. The next day, he signed with Limoges CSP of France for the 2014–15 season.

On August 5, 2015, he signed with Vanoli Cremona of Italy for the 2015–16 season. On January 15, 2016, he parted ways with Cremona after averaging 5.1 points and 3.6 rebounds in fourteen games. Two days later, he signed with Mitteldeutscher BC of the Basketball Bundesliga for the rest of the season. In 15 games with Mitteldeutscher BC, Southerland led the team in scoring with 13.5 ppg, collected 4.5 rpg, and shot 40.4% from three while playing 26.6 mpg.

In July 2016, Southerland joined the Washington Wizards for the 2016 NBA Summer League. On September 18, 2016, he signed with German club s.Oliver Würzburg. On December 6, he parted ways with Würzburg after his two-month contract expired and was not renewed. Five days later, he was acquired by the Santa Cruz Warriors and on December 14, he made his debut for Santa Cruz in a 107–93 win over the Northern Arizona Suns, recording 12 points, two rebounds, one assist and one steal in 16 minutes off the bench.

On February 13, 2018, Southerland was traded by the Santa Cruz Warriors along with the returning player rights to Scott Wood to the South Bay Lakers in exchange for their original first round pick in the 2018 NBA G League Draft.

During the 2019-20 season, Southerland played for the Yokohama B-Corsairs of the Japanese B.League, averaging 17.8 points, 7.9 rebounds, and 2.2 assists per game. On January 15, 2022, he signed with  CAB Madeira of the Liga Portuguesa de Basquetebol.

NBA G League Ignite (2022–present)
On September 28, 2022, Southerland signed with the NBA G League Ignite.

The Basketball Tournament
James Southerland played for Boeheim's Army in the 2018 edition of The Basketball Tournament. In 4 games, he averaged 2.8 points, 0.5 assists, and 3.8 rebounds per game. Boeheim's Army reached the Northeast Regional Championship before falling to the Golden Eagles.

References

External links
Syracuse Orange profile
Profile at Eurobasket.com
FIBA.com profile

1990 births
Living people
American expatriate basketball people in France
American expatriate basketball people in Germany
American expatriate basketball people in Italy
American expatriate basketball people in Japan
American men's basketball players
Basketball players from New York City
Charlotte Bobcats players
Limoges CSP players
Los Angeles D-Fenders players
NBA G League Ignite players
New Orleans Pelicans players
People from Bayside, Queens
Santa Cruz Warriors players
SeaHorses Mikawa players
Small forwards
s.Oliver Würzburg players
South Bay Lakers players
Sportspeople from Queens, New York
Syracuse Orange men's basketball players
Undrafted National Basketball Association players
Vanoli Cremona players
Benjamin N. Cardozo High School alumni